The Los Angeles Angels are a professional baseball team based in Anaheim, California. The team has had four principal owners, and ten General Managers, since its inception in 1961.

Owners

General managers

See also
List of Los Angeles Angels of Anaheim managers
List of Major League Baseball principal owners
History of the Los Angeles Angels of Anaheim

References

External links

Los Angeles Angels of Anaheim Baseball-Reference.com
Angels Strike Force

 
 
Lists of Major League Baseball owners and executives
Owners